Divide and rule policy, or divide and conquer, in politics and sociology is gaining and maintaining power divisively. Historically, this strategy was used in many different ways by empires seeking to expand their territories. However, it has been hard to distinguish between the exploitation of pre-existing divisions by opponents, and the deliberate creation or strengthening of these divisions implied by "divide and rule". 

The strategy, but not the phrase, applies in many ancient cases: the example of Aulus Gabinius exists, parting the Jewish nation into five conventions, reported by Flavius Josephus in Book I, 169–170 of The Jewish War (De bello Judaico). Strabo also reports in Geographica, 8.7.3 that the Achaean League was gradually dissolved when it became part of the Roman province of Macedonia, as the Romans treated the various states differently, wishing to preserve some and to destroy others.

Elements of this technique involve:
 creating or encouraging divisions among the subjects to prevent alliances that could challenge the sovereign and distributing forces that they overpower the other.
 aiding and promoting those who are willing to cooperate with the sovereign
 fostering distrust and enmity between local rulers
 encouraging meaningless expenditures that reduce the capability for political and military spending

Uses of the phrase
The use of this technique is meant to empower the sovereign to control subjects, populations, or factions of different interests, who collectively might be able to oppose its rule. Niccolò Machiavelli identifies a similar application to military strategy, advising in Book VI of The Art of War (1521). (L'arte della guerra):  a Captain should endeavor with every act to divide the forces of the enemy. Machiavelli advises that this act should be achieved either by making him suspicious of his men in whom he trusted, or by giving him cause that he has to separate his forces, and, because of this, become weaker.

The maxim divide et impera has been attributed to Philip II of Macedon.  It was utilised by the Roman ruler Julius Caesar and the French emperor Napoleon (together with the maxim divide ut regnes).

The strategy of division and rule has been attributed to sovereigns, ranging from Louis XI of France to the House of Habsburg. Edward Coke denounces it in Chapter I of the Fourth Part of the Institutes of the Lawes of England, reporting that when it was demanded by the Lords and Commons what might be a principal motive for them to have good success in Parliament, it was answered: "Eritis insuperabiles, si fueritis inseparabiles. Explosum est illud diverbium: Divide, & impera, cum radix & vertex imperii in obedientium consensu rata sunt." [You would be invincible if you were inseparable. This proverb, Divide and rule, has been rejected, since the root and the summit of authority are confirmed by the consent of the subjects.]  In a minor variation, Sir Francis Bacon wrote the phrase "separa et impera" in a letter to James I of 15 February 1615. James Madison made this recommendation in a letter to Thomas Jefferson of 24 October 1787, which summarized the thesis of The Federalist#10: "Divide et impera, the reprobated axiom of tyranny, is under certain (some) qualifications, the only policy, by which a republic can be administered on just principles." In Perpetual Peace: A Philosophical Sketch
by Immanuel Kant (1795), Appendix one, Divide et impera is the third of three political maxims, the others being Fac et excusa (Act now, and make excuses later) and Si fecisti, nega (If you commit a crime, deny it).

Immanuel Kant refers this tactic in the Appendix I of his Perpetual Peace when describing the traits of a political moralist.

In economics, the concept is also mentioned as a strategy for market segmentation to get the most out of the players in a competitive market.

Foreign policy
Divide and rule can be used by states to weaken enemy military alliances. This usually happens when propaganda is disseminated within the enemy states in an attempt to raise doubts about the alliance. Once the alliance weakens or dissolves, a vacuum will allow the state to achieve military dominance.

Politics
In politics, the concept refers to a strategy that breaks up existing power structures, and especially prevents smaller power groups from linking up, causing rivalries and fomenting discord among the people to prevent a rebellion against the elites or the people implementing the strategy. The goal is either to pit the lower classes against themselves to prevent a revolution, or to provide a desired solution to the growing discord that strengthens the power of the elites.

The principle "divide et impera" is cited as a common in politics by Traiano Boccalini in La bilancia politica.

Psychopathy in the workplace

Clive R. Boddy found that "divide and conquer" was a common strategy by corporate psychopaths used as a smokescreen to help consolidate and advance their grip on power in the corporate hierarchy.

Historical examples

Asia

Mongol Empire
While the Mongols imported Central Asian Muslims to serve as administrators in China, the Mongols also sent Han Chinese and Khitans from China to serve as administrators over the Muslim population in Bukhara in Central Asia, using foreigners to curtail the power of the local peoples of both lands.

Indian subcontinent
Some Indian historians, such as politician Shashi Tharoor, assert that the British Raj frequently used this tactic to consolidate their rule and prevent the emergence of the Indian independence movement, citing Lord Elphinstone who said that "Divide et impera was the old Roman maxim, and it should be ours." A Times Literary Supplement review by British historian Jon Wilson suggests that although this was broadly the case a more nuanced approach might be closer to the facts. The classic nationalist position was expressed by the Indian jurist and supporter of Indian reunification Markandey Katju, who wrote in the Pakistani paper The Nation in 2013:

On the other hand the Hindutva movement, allied to recent Indian governments, stresses strongly Hindu-Muslim conflict going back centuries before the arrival of the British. 
Likewise Historian John Keay takes a contrary position regarding British policy, writing:

Similarly, General S.K. Sinha, former Vice-Chief of Army Staff, writes that contrary to what the notion of divide and rule would predict, the Indian Army was effectively integrated:

Middle East
Some analysts assert that the United States is practicing the strategy in the 21st-century Middle East through their supposed escalation of the Sunni–Shia conflict. British journalist Nafeez Ahmed cited a 2008 RAND Corporation study for the U.S Armed Forces which recommended "divide and rule" as a possible strategy against the Muslim world in "the Long War". British historian Christopher Davidson argues that the current crisis in Yemen is being "egged on" by the United States government, and could be part of a wider covert strategy to "spur fragmentation in Iran allies and allow Israel to be surrounded by weak states”.

Ottoman Empire
The Ottoman Empire often used a divide-and-rule strategy, pitting Armenians and Kurds against each other.

Europe
 Herodotus, (Histories, 5.3) claimed that the Thracians would be the strongest nation in the world if they were united.
 Athenian historian Thucydides in his book History of the Peloponnesian War claimed that Alcibiades recommended to Persian statesman Tissaphernes, to weaken both Athens and Sparta for his own Persian's benefit. Alcibiades, suggested to Tissaphernes that 'The cheapest plan was to let the Hellenes wear each other out, at a small share of the expense and without risk to himself.
 Tacitus in Germania. chapter 33 writes "Long, I pray, may foreign nations persist in hating one another .... and fortune can bestow on us no better gift than discord among our foes."
 The Romans invaded the Kingdom of Macedonia from the south and defeated King Perseus in the Battle of Pydna in 168 BC. Macedonia was then divided into four republics that were heavily restricted from relations with one another and other Hellenic states. A ruthless purge occurred, with allegedly anti-Roman citizens being denounced by their compatriots and forcibly deported in large numbers.
 During the Gallic Wars, Caesar was able to use a divide and conquer strategy to easily defeat the Gauls, although the Gauls had conveniently pre-divided themselves, and probably no extra effort was needed by Caesar. By the time the Gauls united under Vercingetorix, it was already too late for them.
 In Revolutions of 1848, the governments which were being revolted against used this tactic to counter the rebels.
 The Salami strategy of Hungarian Communist leader, Mátyás Rákosi.
 The colonial authorities in British Cyprus often stirred up the Turkish minority in order to neutralize agitation from the Greek majority. This policy intentionally cultivated further animosity between the already divided Greek majority and the Turkish minority (which consists of 18% of the population) in the island that remains divided to this day after an invasion by Turkey to establish the state of North Cyprus (which is only diplomatically recognized by Turkey).
The partition of Ireland in 1921 has been claimed as an intentional implementation of this strategy by David Lloyd George, although the religious divisions in Ireland were notorious and of long standing. The Stanford historian Priya Satia claims that the partition of Ireland was in ways a patch-test for the partition of India in 1947.

Mexico

United States
Harry G. Broadman opined in Forbes regarding President Donald Trump: "[a]s in his campaign, the President has been successfully—at least to date—pursuing a divide and conquer strategy domestically and internationally to try to achieve his goals. The result is an absence of a robust set of checks and balances to ensure that the best economic interests of the U.S. and the world will be served."

See also

References

External links
 

1st-millennium BC introductions
Conflict (process)
Latin words and phrases
Machiavellianism
Organizational conflict
Philip II of Macedon
Political terminology
Power (social and political) concepts
Strategy
Workplace